Follow Me Down is the second studio album by American folk and bluegrass singer-songwriter Sarah Jarosz, released on May 17, 2011 on Sugar Hill Records. It was recorded and mixed at Minutia Studios and mastered at The Mastering Lab in Nashville, TN, by Gary Paczosa with additional engineering by Brandon Bell. In 2012, the song "Come Around" was nominated for Song of the Year at the Americana Music Honors & Awards.

Track listing

Personnel
 Sarah Jarosz – lead vocals, guitar, electric guitar, banjo, Clawhammer banjo, toy piano, octave mandolin, Wurlitzer organ, tenor guitar
 Viktor Krauss – bass (tracks 1, 2, 3, 5, 9 and 10)
 Nathaniel Smith – cello (tracks 1, 2, 3, 5, 7)
 Shannon Forrest – drums (tracks 1, 2, 3 and 9)
 John Leventhal – electric guitar (track 1)
 Shawn Colvin – harmony vocals (track 1)
 Alex Hargreaves – violin (tracks 1, 5 and 7)
 Béla Fleck – banjo (track 2)
 Darrell Scott – harmony vocals (tracks 2 and 9)
 Casey Driessen – violin (track 2)
 Dan Tyminski – harmony vocals (track 3)
 Jerry Douglas – Lap steel guitar (track 3), Weissenborn slide guitar (tracks 4 and 10), dobro (tracks 6, 7, 9 and 10)
 Stuart Douglas – violin (track 3)
 Mark Schatz – bass (tracks 4, 6 and 7)
 Vince Gill – harmony vocals (track 4)
 Sarah Siskind – harmony vocals (tracks 5 and 6)
 Stuart Duncan – violin (tracks 4, 6 and 11), viola, gut string banjo (track 4)
 Noam Pikelny – banjo (track 8)
 Paul Kowert – bass (track 8)
 Punch Brothers – ensemble (track 8)
 Chris Eldridge – guitar (track 8)
 Chris Thile – mandolin (track 8)
 Gabe Witcher – violin (track 8)
 Jenny Conlee-Drizos – accordion (track 10)
 Edgar Meyer – bass (track 11)
 Seamus Egan – wooden flute (track 11)

References

2011 albums
Sarah Jarosz albums
Sugar Hill Records albums